Algernon Cadwallader is an American emo and math rock band from Yardley, Pennsylvania. They were originally active from 2005 to 2012. In 2022, the band regrouped and began touring again. Stereogum referred to the band as the "heroes of the emo revival".

History
Early Years (2005-2012)

Peter Helmis, Joe Reinhart, and Colin Mahony met in high school and formed the precursor to Algernon Cadwallader, Halfway to Holland, with their friend TJ DeBlois (drummer of metalcore band A Life Once Lost.) The lineup was Helmis and Reinhart on guitars with Mahony on bass and Helmis on vocals as well. Halfway to Holland differed from Algernon Cadwallader, with a heavier driving sound, more reverb on guitars and chords rounding out rhythm as opposed to the clean math rock riffs Algernon Cadwallader has become known for. While the band was short lived, it continues to have a cult following to this day. Helmis went on to various solo and duo acts, while Mahony and Reinhart formed another band, Like Lions, with fellow school mates. Reinhart and Mahony's collaboration with Like Lions was short lived due to musical differences, and subsequently reached out to Helmis and friend Nick Tazza (from Ape Up!) to form Algernon Cadwallader in 2005.

The line up changed with Helmis still on vocals but switching bass with Mahony, now on rhythm guitar. A five song "Demo" was released in 2006, with more of a heavy influence from the math-rock/Midwest emo genre, than their previous project. Lyrical content however, was a more upbeat, happy musings of personal experiences or day to day life, than the darker, more somber tones the emo genre had been known for. They released their first full-length album in 2008 titled Some Kind Of Cadwallader. Up until this point, shows mainly consisted of Philadelphia basements and house shows, with small tours to neighboring cities. Tazza left the band in early 2008 and was replaced with Matt "Tank" Bergman (US Funk Team) Mahony left the band later in 2008 and Algernon became a trio, choosing not to replace Mahony.

The trio toured throughout America and a European leg. In 2009 they released Fun EP followed by their second full-length album in 2011 titled Parrot Flies. In 2012 the band had been "laid to rest."

Post Breakup (2012-2022)

In 2012, Reinhart, Helmis and Tazza, along with Bass player Nate Dionne (Snowing) formed short lived indie rock band, Dogs on Acid. 

In 2018, Algernon Cadwallader re-issued their albums to digital streaming services for the first time. The re-issue contained what the band referred to as their "third LP", a compilation of their 2006 demo, the 2009 Fun EP and several b-sides and covers of instrumental Beatles and Beach Boys songs, "some of it we decided to record and put vocals on it.”

Algernon Cadwallader has been herald for emo-revival in the mid 2000s and has consistently been praised for their math rock arrangements consisting of alternative tunings and off-time rhythm, earning spots on several "top lists" of emo bands.

Reinhart went on to join Philadelphia indie rock band Hop Along and well as creating Philadelphia based recording studio, Headroom Studios. Helmis continued with other feats such as Peter the Piano Eater, Yankee Bluff, and Peter & Craig. 

2022-Present

On June 1, 2022 the band – now consisting of all previous members – announced a North American reunion tour.

After the success of their North American tour, Algernon Cadwallader announced two New Years Eve shows at Philadelphia's Johnny Brenda's.

On January 19th, 2023 a headlining Japan tour was announced for April of 2023 followed by a Europe/Uk in June of 2023.

Musical style
Algernon Cadwallader's music has been described as emo and math rock. They cite Cap'n Jazz and The Beatles as influences.

Members
Peter Helmis - vocals, bass guitar (2005-2012, 2022-present)
Joe Reinhart - guitar (2005-2012, 2022-present)
Colin Mahony - guitar (2005–2008, 2022-present)
Nick Tazza - drums (2005–2008, 2022-present)
Tank Bergman - drums (2008-2012, 2022-present)

Timeline

Discography
Studio albums
 Some Kind of Cadwallader (2008)
 Parrot Flies (2011)
EPs
 Demo (2006)
 Fun (2009)
Splits/Compilations/Live recordings
 "Life on an Island Summer Compilation Vol. 2 (2010) - Look Down (feat. Hop Along)
 Cover Up (2011) – "This Boy" (The Beatles)
 Fuck Off All Nerds: A Benefit Compilation For Mitch Dubey (2011)
 Summer Singles (2011) – "(Na Na Na Na) Simulation"
 What It Is (2011)
 Algernon Cadwallader (2018)

References

External links
Official website
Facebook

American emo musical groups
Math rock groups
Punk rock groups from Pennsylvania
Musical groups from Philadelphia
Emo revival groups